The 2008 Chicago White Sox season was the organization's 109th season in Chicago and 108th in the American League. The White Sox won the American League Central division title for the first time since 2005. They finished the regular season tied with the Minnesota Twins (88–74) and won a one-game playoff for the division title. They subsequently lost the 2008 American League Division Series to Tampa Bay Rays.

Individual highlights for the White Sox included the breakout season of offseason acquisition Carlos Quentin and the strong rookie season of infielder Alexei Ramírez. Gavin Floyd nearly threw a no-hitter against the Minnesota Twins on May 6, broken up by Joe Mauer's double in the ninth inning.
The White Sox set a new home record at U.S. Cellular Field of 54–28 (.658 pct.) breaking the 2003 home record of 51–30 (.629 pct.).

Offseason 
Finishing fourth in the American League Central division coupled with having both MLB's lowest batting average and on-base percentage in 2007 prompted the White Sox to make numerous transactions, particularly with West Coast teams, to improve their lineup.

 Infielder Juan Uribe re-signed with the White Sox for a one-year, $4.5 million contract.
 Infielder Orlando Cabrera was acquired from the Los Angeles Angels of Anaheim for starting pitcher Jon Garland.
 Relief pitcher Scott Linebrink was signed to a four-year contract worth $19 million.
 Outfielder Carlos Quentin was acquired from the Arizona Diamondbacks for Minor League infielder Chris Carter.
 Cuban infielder Alexei Ramírez signed with the White Sox.
 Nick Swisher was acquired from the Oakland Athletics for three Minor League prospects: pitchers Gio González and Fautino de los Santos and outfielder Ryan Sweeney.
 Octavio Dotel, former reliever for the Kansas City Royals and Atlanta Braves, was signed to a two-year contract for $11 million.

Other players no longer with the team from the 2007 season are Alex Cintrón, Darin Erstad (signed with Houston), Andy González, Mike Myers, Heath Phillips, Scott Podsednik, and Luis Terrero.

Two coaching staff changes were made, with the hiring of Pittsburgh Pirates third base coach Jeff Cox and bullpen coach Juan Nieves. Cox replaces Razor Shines, while Nieves replaces Art Kusnyer.

Regular season and post season

March/April 
Record: 14–13
 On April 13 against the Detroit Tigers, the Sox hit two grand slams in a game, ones by Paul Konerko and Joe Crede. It was the third time in White Sox history when the team hit two grand slams in a game. The two previous times were (1) September 4, 1995, when Robin Ventura hit two grand slams at Texas and (2) May 19, 1996, when Darren Lewis and Robin Ventura each hit slams at Detroit.

May 
Record: 16–13
 On May 6 against the Minnesota Twins, Gavin Floyd took a no-hitter into the ninth inning, when Joe Mauer hit a double with one out. The only run the Sox allowed was unearned, on a sacrifice fly by Jason Kubel in the fourth inning. The Sox held on for a 6–1 victory. If Gavin Floyd had completed the no-hitter, it would have been the second of three consecutive seasons that the White Sox threw one (Mark Buehrle in 2007 as well as in 2009, which was Mark Buehrle's perfect game).

June 
Record: 17–10
 On June 5, the White Sox drafted University of Georgia SS Gordon Beckham with the eighth overall pick.

July 

Record: 13–12

 On July 31, at the trading deadline, the White Sox traded relief pitcher Nick Masset and minor leaguer second baseman Danny Richar for Ken Griffey Jr. of the Cincinnati Reds.

August 
Record: 17–11
 On August 5 against the Detroit Tigers, in the top of the 14th inning, the Tigers scored two runs via a two-run home run by Plácido Polanco, which made it 8-6. In the bottom of the 14th, the Sox came back with four runs: Jermaine Dye reached base on an error, and the Nick Swisher hit a walk-off three-run homer, making the final score it 10-8.
 On August 14 against the Kansas City Royals, Jim Thome, Paul Konerko, Alexei Ramírez, and Juan Uribe hit consecutive home runs in the sixth inning. This was the first time the White Sox hit four consecutive home runs in an inning, and just sixth time in MLB history (the first since the Boston Red Sox did it on April 22, 2007). The Sox swept the Royals with the final score of 9–2.

September 
Record: 12–15
 The Sox faced three different teams in three consecutive games, which was just the third time this had happened in MLB history (the White Sox and Cleveland Indians each having done so in September 2000). The Sox won all three games: (1) the regularly scheduled season finale against the Cleveland Indians, (2) a game against the Detroit Tigers that had been rescheduled from earlier in the month due to rain, and (3) the tiebreaker game against the Minnesota Twins. Having won, they then faced a fourth team in their next game to begin the playoffs.
 September was the team's first month with a losing record in the season. The month was highlighted with the AL Central tie-breaker game, which took place at U.S. Cellular Field on September 30 vs. the Minnesota Twins. It was Game 163 of the regular season. The White Sox organization called on the fans who attended the game to wear all black. There was almost 100% participation in what the White Sox called "the blackout game." The White Sox won the game 1-0.

October 

Record: 1–3
 The 2008 playoffs saw the White Sox square off with the Tampa Bay Rays in a matchup of the second and third seeds. The White Sox started Javier Vázquez in Game 1. Rays rookie Evan Longoria hit two home runs in a 6-4 win for Tampa. Mark Buehrle started Game 2, which saw the White Sox unable to hold an early lead, eventually losing 6-4. For Games 3 and 4, the series moved to Chicago. The Sox took Game 3 by the score of 5-3, with John Danks getting the victory. The Chicago crowd continued the new "blackout" tradition, but the Rays proved to be too much for the Sox in Game 4, winning 6-2 and taking the series 3 games to 1.

Season standings 

The Chicago White Sox claim their second A.L Central Championship in the last four years.

Record vs. opponents

Game log 

|- align="center" bgcolor="ffbbbb"
| 1 || March 31 || @ Indians || 8–10 || Betancourt (1–0) || Dotel (0–1) || Borowski (1) || 3:21 || 41,872 || 0–1 || box
|- align="center" bgcolor="ffbbbb"
| 2 || April 2 || @ Indians || 2–7 || Carmona (1–0) || Vázquez (0–1) || || 3:31 || 17,645 || 0–2 || box
|- align="center" bgcolor="bbffbb"
| 3 || April 3 || @ Indians || 2–1 || Dotel (1–1) || Westbrook (0–1) || Jenks (1) || 2:27 || 15,785 || 1–2 || box
|- align="center" bgcolor="bbffbb"
| 4 || April 4 || @ Tigers || 8–5 || Logan (1–0) || Grilli (0–1) || Jenks (2) || 3:10 || 34,569 || 2–2 || box
|- align="center" bgcolor="bbffbb"
| 5 || April 5 || @ Tigers || 5–3 || Floyd (1–0) || Miner (0–1) || Jenks (3) || 2:39 || 42,381 || 3–2 || box
|- align="center" bgcolor="bbffbb"
| 6 || April 6 || @ Tigers || 13–2 || Buehrle (1–0) || Verlander (0–1) || || 2:45 || 35,230 || 4–2 || box
|- align="center" bgcolor="bbffbb"
| 7 || April 7 || Twins || 7–4 || Vázquez (1–1) || Guerrier (0–1) || Jenks (4) || 2:55 || 38,082 || 5–2 || box
|- align="center" bgcolor="ffbbbb"
| 8 || April 9 || Twins || 5–12 || Baker (2–0) || Danks (0–1) || Bass (1) || 3:01 || 16,499 || 5–3 || box
|- align="center" bgcolor="bbbbbb"
| – || April 10 || Twins ||colspan=8| Postponed (rain), rescheduled for June 9
|- align="center" bgcolor="ffbbbb"
| 9 || April 11 || Tigers || 2–5 || López (1–0) || Contreras (0–1) || Jones (1) || 3:13 || 26,094 || 5–4 || box
|- align="center" bgcolor="bbffbb"
| 10 || April 12 || Tigers || 7–0 || Floyd (2–0) || Verlander (0–2) || || 2:25 || 29,649 || 6–4 || box
|- align="center" bgcolor="bbffbb"
| 11 || April 13 || Tigers || 11–0 || Vázquez (2–1) || Rogers (0–3) || || 2:34 || 26,294 || 7–4 || box
|- align="center" bgcolor="ffbbbb"
| 12 || April 14 || Athletics || 1–2 || Smith (1–0) || Buehrle (1–1) || Street (4) || 2:40 || 20,430 || 7–5 || box
|- align="center" bgcolor="bbffbb"
| 13 || April 15 || Athletics || 4–1 || Danks (1–1) || Eveland (1–1) || Jenks (5) || 2:18 || 18,254 || 8–5 || box
|- align="center" bgcolor="bbffbb"
| 14 || April 16 || @ Orioles || 3–1 || Contreras (1–1) || Loewen (0–1) || Jenks (6) || 2:25 || 12,080 || 9–5 || box
|- align="center" bgcolor="ffbbbb"
| 15 || April 17 || @ Orioles || 5 – 6 (10) || Sherrill (1–0) || Logan (1–1) || || 3:20 || 13,676 || 9–6 || box
|- align="center" bgcolor="bbffbb"
| 16 || April 18 || @ Rays || 9–2 || Vázquez (3–1) || Niemann (1–1) || || 3:02 || 12,379 || 10–6 || box
|- align="center" bgcolor="ffbbbb"
| 17 || April 19 || @ Rays || 0–5 || Sonnanstine (2–1) || Buehrle (1–2) || || 2:02 || 17,613 || 10–7 || box
|- align="center" bgcolor="bbffbb"
| 18 || April 20 || @ Rays || 6–0 || Danks (2–1) || Jackson (2–2) || || 2:34 || 17,212 || 11–7 || box
|- align="center" bgcolor="ffbbbb"
| 19 || April 22 || Yankees || 5–9 || Wang (4–0) || Contreras (1–2) || || 3:44 || 25,012 || 11–8 || box
|- align="center" bgcolor="ffbbbb"
| 20 || April 23 || Yankees || 4–6 || Mussina (2–3) || Vázquez (3–2) || Rivera (6) || 3:06 || 27,751 || 11–9 || box
|- align="center" bgcolor="bbffbb"
| 21 || April 24 || Yankees || 7–6 || Jenks (1–0) || Chamberlain (1–1) || || 3:05 || 27,243 || 12–9 || box
|- align="center" bgcolor="bbbbbb"
| – || April 25 || Orioles || colspan=8 | Postponed (rain) Rescheduled for April 26
|- align="center" bgcolor="ffbbbb"
| 22 || April 26 || Orioles || 1–5 || Burres (3–1) || Danks (2–2) || Sherrill (9) || 2:41 || 23,043 || 12–10 || box
|- align="center" bgcolor="bbffbb"
| 23 || April 26 || Orioles || 6–5 || Jenks (2–0) || Bierd (0–1) || || 3:28 || 34,757 || 13–10 || box
|- align="center" bgcolor="bbffbb"
| 24 || April 27 || Orioles || 6–1 || Contreras (2–2) || Guthrie (0–3) || || 2:58 || 29,756 || 14–10 || box
|- align="center" bgcolor="ffbbbb"
| 25* || April 28 || Orioles || 3 – 4 (14) || Castillo (1–0) || H. Ramírez (1–3) || Cherry (1) || 4:42 || 17,367* || 14–11 || box
|- align="center" bgcolor="ffbbbb"
| 26 || April 29 || @ Twins || 1–3 || Bonser (2–4) || Floyd (2–1) || Nathan (8) || 2:32 || 20,891 || 14–12 || box
|- align="center" bgcolor="ffbbbb"
| 27 || April 30 || @ Twins || 3–4 || Blackburn (2–1) || Wassermann (0–1) || Nathan (9) || 2:37 || 19,137 || 14–13 || box
|-
| colspan=11 | * Completed the game at Oriole Park at Camden Yards on August 25 from the 12th inning on with the same att. number from U.S. Cellular Field.
|-

|- align="center" bgcolor="ffbbbb"
| 28 || May 2 || @ Blue Jays || 0–2 || Marcum (3–2) || Buehrle (1–3) || Downs (2) || 2:10 || 21,057 || 14–14 || box
|- align="center" bgcolor="ffbbbb"
| 29 || May 3 || @ Blue Jays || 2–5 || Litsch (4–1) || Danks (2–3) || Ryan (4) || 2:36 || 27,778 || 14–15 || box
|- align="center" bgcolor="ffbbbb"
| 30 || May 4 || @ Blue Jays || 3–4 || Halladay (3–4) || Contreras (2–3) || Downs (3) || 2:12 || 26,247 || 14–16 || box
|- align="center" bgcolor="ffbbbb"
| 31 || May 5 || @ Blue Jays || 0–1 || McGowan (2–2) || Vázquez (3–3) || Ryan (5) || 2:40 || 16,602 || 14–17 || box
|- align="center" bgcolor="bbffbb"
| 32 || May 6 || Twins || 7–1 || Floyd (3–1) || Blackburn (2–2) || || 2:27 || 23,480 || 15–17 || box
|- align="center" bgcolor="ffbbbb"
| 33 || May 7 || Twins || 1–13 || Hernández (5–1) || Buehrle (1–4) || || 2:32 || 21,092 || 15–18 || box
|- align="center" bgcolor="bbffbb"
| 34 || May 8 || Twins || 6–2 || Danks (3–3) || Slowey (0–2) || || 3:15 || 25,193 || 16–18 || box
|- align="center" bgcolor="bbffbb"
| 35 || May 9 || @ Mariners || 4–2 || Contreras (3–3) || Silva (3–2) || Jenks (7) || 2:23 || 27,169 || 17–18 || box
|- align="center" bgcolor="bbffbb"
| 36 || May 10 || @ Mariners || 8–4 || Vázquez (4–3) || Washburn (2–5) || || 2:58 || 33,078 || 18–18 || box
|- align="center" bgcolor="ffbbbb"
| 37 || May 11 || @ Mariners || 3–6 || Washburn (3–4) || Floyd (3–2) || Putz (3) || 3:03 || 30,346 || 18–19 || box
|- align="center" bgcolor="ffbbbb"
| 38 || May 12 || @ Angels || 7–10 || Adenhart (1–0) || Buehrle (1–5) || Rodríguez (15) || 2:49 || 38,723 || 18–20 || box
|- align="center" bgcolor="ffbbbb"
| 39 || May 13 || @ Angels || 0–2 || Shields (2–0) || Dotel (1–2) || Rodríguez (16) || 2:40 || 35,333 || 18–21 || box
|- align="center" bgcolor="bbffbb"
| 40 || May 14 || @ Angels || 6–1 || Contreras (4–3) || Shields (2–1) || || 2:37 || 37,059 || 19–21 || box
|- align="center" bgcolor="bbffbb"
| 41 || May 15 || @ Angels || 4–3 || Dotel (2–2) || Rodríguez (0–1) || Jenks (8) || 3:14 || 41,444 || 20–21 || box
|- align="center" bgcolor="bbffbb"
| 42 || May 16 || @ Giants || 2–0 || Floyd (4–2) || Sánchez  (2–3) || Jenks (9) || 2:50 || 35,482 || 21–21 || box
|- align="center" bgcolor="bbffbb"
| 43 || May 17 || @ Giants || 3–1 || Buehrle (2–5) || Zito (0–8) || Jenks (10) || 2:52 || 37,006 || 22–21 || box
|- align="center" bgcolor="bbffbb"
| 44 || May 18 || @ Giants || 13–8 || Thornton (1–0) || Walker (1–2) || Masset (1) || 3:01 || 34,331 || 23–21 || box
|- align="center" bgcolor="bbffbb"
| 45 || May 20 || Indians || 4–1 || Contreras (5–3) || Sabathia (3–6) || Jenks (11) || 2:50 || 27,533 || 24–21 || box
|- align="center" bgcolor="bbffbb"
| 46 || May 21 || Indians || 7–2 || Vázquez (5–3) || Byrd (2–4) || || 2:45 || 38,518 || 25–21 || box
|- align="center" bgcolor="bbffbb"
| 47 || May 22 || Indians || 3–1 || Linebrink (1–0) || Laffey (2–3) || Jenks (12) || 2:17 || 28,040 || 26–21 || box
|- align="center" bgcolor="ffbbbb"
| 48 || May 23 || Angels || 1–3 || Saunders (8–1) || Floyd (4–3) || Rodríguez (20) || 2:12 || 28,156 || 26–22 || box
|- align="center" bgcolor="ffbbbb"
| 49 || May 24 || Angels || 0–2 || Weaver (4–5) || Danks (3–4) || Rodríguez (21) || 2:53 || 38,434 || 26–23 || box
|- align="center" bgcolor="bbffbb"
| 50 || May 25 || Angels || 3–2 || Linebrink (2–0) || Lackey (1–1) || || 2:05 || 36,195 || 27–23 || box
|- align="center" bgcolor="bbffbb"
| 51 || May 26 || @ Indians || 6 – 3 (12) || Logan (2–1) || Elarton (0–1) || Jenks (13) || 4:02 || 31,006 || 28–23 || box
|- align="center" bgcolor="ffbbbb"
| 52 || May 27 || @ Indians || 2–8 || Laffey (3–3) || Buehrle (2–6) || || 2:50 || 25,426 || 28–24 || box
|- align="center" bgcolor="bbffbb"
| 53 || May 28 || @ Indians || 6–5 || Floyd (5–3) || Betancourt (1–3) || Jenks (14) || 3:11 || 31,740 || 29–24 || box
|- align="center" bgcolor="bbffbb"
| 54 || May 29 || @ Rays || 5–1 || Danks (4–4) || Jackson (3–4) || || 2:46 || 12,636 || 30–24 || box
|- align="center" bgcolor="ffbbbb"
| 55 || May 30 || @ Rays || 1–2 || Wheeler (1–3) || Linebrink (2–1) || || 2:50 || 14,679 || 30–25 || box
|- align="center" bgcolor="ffbbbb"
| 56 || May 31 || @ Rays || 0–2 || Kazmir (5–1) || Vázquez (5–4) || Balfour (1) || 2:46 || 36,048 || 30–26 || box
|-

|- align="center" bgcolor="ffbbbb"
| 57 || June 1 || @ Rays || 3 – 4 (10) || Howell (4–0) || Thornton (1–1) || || 2:41 || 24,720 || 30–27 || box
|- align="center" bgcolor="bbffbb"
| 58 || June 3 || Royals || 9–5 || Floyd (6–3) || Greinke (5–3) || || 2:33 || 21,727 || 31–27 || box
|- align="center" bgcolor="bbffbb"
| 59 || June 4 || Royals || 6 – 4 (15) || Dotel (3–2) || Gobble (0–1) || || 4:23 || 23,727 || 32–27 || box
|- align="center" bgcolor="bbffbb"
| 60 || June 5 || Royals || 6–2 || Contreras (6–3) || Meche (3–8) || || 2:44 || 25,104 || 33–27 || box
|- align="center" bgcolor="bbffbb"
| 61 || June 6 || Twins || 10–6 || Vázquez (6–4) || Blackburn (4–4) || || 2:53 || 26,459 || 34–27 || box
|- align="center" bgcolor="bbffbb"
| 62 || June 7 || Twins || 11–2 || Buehrle (3–6) || Hernández (6–3) || || 2:16 || 32,930 || 35–27 || box
|- align="center" bgcolor="bbffbb"
| 63 || June 8 || Twins || 12–2 || Floyd (7–3) || Slowey (2–6) || || 2:25 || 30,565 || 36–27 || box
|- align="center" bgcolor="bbffbb"
| 64 || June 9 || Twins || 7–5 || Thornton (2–1) || Guerrier (3–2) || Jenks (15) || 2:58 || 21,126 || 37–27 || box
|- align="center" bgcolor="ffbbbb"
| 65 || June 10 || @ Tigers || 4–6 || Robertson (4–6) || Contreras (6–4) || Jones (11) || 2:34 || 38,295 || 37–28 || box
|- align="center" bgcolor="ffbbbb"
| 66 || June 11 || @ Tigers || 1–5 || Verlander (3–9) || Vázquez (6–5) || || 2:13 || 38,693 || 37–29 || box
|- align="center" bgcolor="ffbbbb"
|| 67 || June 12 || @ Tigers || 1–2 || Jones (2–0) || Dotel (3–3) || || 2:04 || 40,297 || 37–30 || box
|-align="center" bgcolor="bbffbb"
| 68 || June 13 || Rockies || 5–4 || Thornton (3–1) || Herges (2–3) || Jenks (16) || 2:28 || 30,143 || 38–30 || box
|- align="center" bgcolor="ffbbbb"
| 69 || June 14 || Rockies || 0–2 || Grilli (2–2) || Dotel (3–4) || Fuentes (10) || 2:56 || 35,663 || 38–31 || box
|- align="center" bgcolor="ffbbbb"
| 70 || June 15 || Rockies || 3–5 || Cook (10–3) || Contreras (6–5) || Fuentes (11) || 2:44 || 32,004 || 38–32 || box
|- align="center" bgcolor="bbffbb"
| 71 || June 17 || Pirates || 16–5 || Vázquez (7–5) || Snell (3–7) || || 3:15 || 28,012 || 39–32 || box
|- align="center" bgcolor="bbffbb"
| 72 || June 18 || Pirates || 8–2 || Buehrle (4–6) || Gorzelanny (5–6) || || 2:17 || 28,570 || 40–32 || box
|- align="center" bgcolor="bbffbb"
| 73 || June 19 || Pirates || 13–8 || Floyd (8–3) || Dumatrait (3–4) || || 2:55 || 26,685 || 41–32 || box
|- align="center" bgcolor="ffbbbb"
| 74 || June 20 || @ Cubs || 3–4 || Wood (4–1) || Linebrink (2–2) || || 2:32 || 41,106 || 41–33 || box
|- align="center" bgcolor="ffbbbb"
| 75 || June 21 || @ Cubs || 7–11 || Marquis (6–3) || Contreras (6–6) || Wood (19) || 2:52 || 41,021 || 41–34 || box
|- align="center" bgcolor="ffbbbb"
| 76 || June 22 || @ Cubs || 1–7 || Dempster (9–2) || Vázquez (7–6) || || 2:52 || 41,034 || 41–35 || box
|- align="center" bgcolor="bbffbb"
| 77 || June 24 || @ Dodgers || 6–1 || Buehrle (5–6) || Lowe (5–7) || || 2:05 || 43,900 || 42–35 || box
|- align="center" bgcolor="ffbbbb"
| 78 || June 25 || @ Dodgers || 0–5 || Stults (2–0) || Floyd (8–4) || || 2:22 || 40,162 || 42–36 || box
|- align="center" bgcolor="bbffbb"
| 79 || June 26 || @ Dodgers || 2–0 || Danks (5–4) || Kershaw (0–2) || Jenks (17) || 2:58 || 37,956 || 43–36 || box
|- align="center" bgcolor="bbffbb"
| 80 || June 27 || Cubs || 10–3 || Contreras (7–6) || Dempster (9–3) || || 2:49 || 39,132 || 44–36 || box
|- align="center" bgcolor="bbffbb"
| 81 || June 28 || Cubs || 6–5 || Thornton (4–1) || Mármol (1–3) || Jenks (18) || 3:03 || 39,143 || 45–36 || box
|- align="center" bgcolor="bbffbb"
| 82 || June 29 || Cubs || 5–1 || Buehrle (6–6) || Marshall (0–2) || || 2:34 || 39,573 || 46–36 || box
|- align="center" bgcolor="bbffbb"
| 83 || June 30 || Indians || 9–7 || Floyd (9–4) || Sowers (0–4) || Thornton (1) || 2:57 || 38,466 || 47–36 || box
|-

|- align="center" bgcolor="bbffbb"
| 84 || July 1 || Indians || 3 – 2 (10) || Russell (1–0) || Borowski (1–3) || || 2:44 || 25,502 || 48–36 || box
|- align="center" bgcolor="bbffbb"
| 85 || July 2 || Indians || 6 – 5 (10) || Russell (2–0) || Kobayashi (4–4) || || 3:11 || 23,522 || 49–36 || box
|- align="center" bgcolor="ffbbbb"
| 86 || July 3 || Athletics || 2–3 || Duchscherer (9–5) || Vázquez (7–7) || Street (16) || 2:21 || 26,730 || 49–37 || box
|- align="center" bgcolor="ffbbbb"
| 87 || July 4 || Athletics || 1–7 || Blanton (5–11) || Buehrle (6–7) || || 2:53 || 29,600 || 49–38 || box
|- align="center" bgcolor="bbffbb"
| 88 || July 5 || Athletics || 6–1 || Floyd (10–4) || Smith (5–7) || || 2:44 || 35,586 || 50–38 || box
|- align="center" bgcolor="bbffbb"
| 89 || July 6 || Athletics || 4–3 || Danks (6–4) || Harden (5–1) || Linebrink (1) || 2:47 || 31,955 || 51–38 || box
|- align="center" bgcolor="bbffbb"
| 90 || July 8 || @ Royals || 8 – 7 (13) || Masset (1–0) || Tejeda (0–1) || || 4:20 || 13,614 || 52–38 || box
|- align="center" bgcolor="bbffbb"
| 91 || July 9 || @ Royals || 7–6 || Russell (3–0) || Tejeda (0–2) || Dotel (1) || 2:46 || 16,502 || 53–38 || box
|- align="center" bgcolor="ffbbbb"
| 92 || July 10 || @ Royals || 1–4 || Mahay (5–0) || Buehrle (6–8) || Soria (24) || 2:26 || 14,547 || 53–39 || box
|- align="center" bgcolor="ffbbbb"
| 93 || July 11 || @ Rangers || 2–7 || Mendoza (2–3) || Floyd (10–5) || Guardado (2) || 2:50 || 28,003 || 53–40 || box
|- align="center" bgcolor="bbffbb"
| 94 || July 12 || @ Rangers || 9–7 || Danks (7–4) || Millwood (6–5) || || 3:29 || 39,209 || 54–40 || box
|- align="center" bgcolor="ffbbbb"
| 95 || July 13 || @ Rangers || 11–12 || Wright (6–4) || Logan (2–2) || || 4:01 || 28,459 || 54–41 || box
|- align="center"
| colspan="11" bgcolor="#bbcaff" | All-Star Break: AL defeats NL 4–3 (15) at Yankee Stadium
|- align="center" bgcolor="bbffbb"
| 96 || July 18 || Royals || 9–5 || Buehrle (7–8) || Greinke (7–6) || || 2:59 || 36,291 || 55–41 || box
|- align="center" bgcolor="ffbbbb"
| 97 || July 19 || Royals || 1–9 || Meche (7–9) || Floyd (10–6) || || 2:51 || 36,566 || 55–42 || box
|- align="center" bgcolor="ffbbbb"
| 98 || July 20 || Royals || 7–8 || R. Ramírez (1–1) || Thornton (4–2) || Soria (26) || 3:09 || 32,269 || 55–43 || box
|- align="center" bgcolor="ffbbbb"
| 99 || July 21 || Rangers || 1–6 || Feldman (4–3) || Vázquez (7–8) || || 2:37 || 39,547 || 55–44 || box
|- align="center" bgcolor="bbffbb"
| 100 || July 22 || Rangers || 10–2 || Buehrle (8–8) || Mendoza (2–4) || || 2:28 || 32,670 || 56–44 || box
|- align="center" bgcolor="bbffbb"
| 101 || July 23 || Rangers || 10–8 || Dotel (4–4) || Guardado (1–2) || Jenks (19) || 3:05 || 35,353 || 57–44 || box
|- align="center" bgcolor="bbffbb"
| 102 || July 25 || @ Tigers || 6–5 || Carrasco (1–0) || Jones (4–1) || Jenks (20) || 2:52 || 44,393 || 58–44 || box
|- align="center" bgcolor="bbffbb"
| 103 || July 26 || @ Tigers || 7–6 || Danks (8–4) || Verlander (8–10) || Jenks (21) || 3:05 || 45,280 || 59–44 || box
|- align="center" bgcolor="ffbbbb"
| 104 || July 27 || @ Tigers || 4–6 || Miner (5–3) || Vázquez (7–9) || || 2:46 || 41,790 || 59–45 || box
|- align="center" bgcolor="ffbbbb"
| 105 || July 28 || @ Twins || 0–7 || Slowey (7–7) || Buehrle (8–9) || || 2:28 || 30,126 || 59–46 || box
|- align="center" bgcolor="ffbbbb"
| 106 || July 29 || @ Twins || 5–6 || Perkins (8–3) || Richard (0–1) || Nathan (29) || 2:50 || 35,999 || 59–47 || box
|- align="center" bgcolor="bbffbb"
| 107 || July 30 || @ Twins || 8–3 || Floyd (11–6) || Hernández (10–8) || || 2:52 || 42,705 || 60–47 || box
|- align="center" bgcolor="ffbbbb"
| 108 || July 31 || @ Twins || 6–10 || Crain (4–2) || Thornton (4–3) || || 3:23 || 31,493 || 60–48 || box
|-

|- align="center" bgcolor="bbffbb"
| 109 || August 1 || @ Royals || 4–2 || Vázquez (8–9) || Hochevar (6–9) || Jenks (22) || 2:54 || 21,291 || 61–48 || box
|- align="center" bgcolor="ffbbbb"
| 110 || August 2 || @ Royals || 7–9 || Davies (5–2) || Buehrle (8–10) || Soria (31) || 3:01 || 21,866 || 61–49 || box
|- align="center" bgcolor="ffbbbb"
| 111 || August 3 || @ Royals || 3–14 || Greinke (9–7) || Richard (0–2) || || 2:59 || 15,268 || 61–50 || box
|- align="center" bgcolor="bbffbb"
| 112 || August 5 || Tigers || 10 – 8 (14) || Russell (4–0) || Zumaya (0–1) || || 4:58 || 35,371 || 62–50 || box
|- align="center" bgcolor="bbffbb"
| 113 || August 6 || Tigers || 5–1 || Danks (9–4) || Verlander (8–12) || || 2:31 || 34,124 || 63–50 || box
|- align="center" bgcolor="ffbbbb"
| 114 || August 7 || Tigers || 3–8 || Miner (6–4) || Vázquez (8–10) || Rodney (2) || 3:08 || 36,383 || 63–51 || box
|- align="center" bgcolor="bbffbb"
| 115 || August 8 || Red Sox || 5–3 || Buehrle (9–10) || Lester (10–4) || Jenks (23) || 2:27 || 38,621 || 64–51 || box
|- align="center" bgcolor="ffbbbb"
| 116 || August 9 || Red Sox || 2–6 || Matsuzaka (13–2) || Logan (2–3) || || 2:54 || 39,243 || 64–52 || box
|- align="center" bgcolor="bbffbb"
| 117 || August 10 || Red Sox || 6–5 || Floyd (12–6) || Buchholz (2–8) || Jenks (24) || 3:06 || 39,008 || 65–52 || box
|- align="center" bgcolor="ffbbbb"
| 118 || August 11 || Red Sox || 1–5 || Beckett (11–8) || Danks (9–5) || || 2:48 || 32,634 || 65–53 || box
|- align="center" bgcolor="bbffbb"
| 119 || August 12 || Royals || 9–0 || Vázquez (9–10) || Bannister (7–11) || || 2:13 || 31,099 || 66–53 || box
|- align="center" bgcolor="bbffbb"
| 120 || August 13 || Royals || 4–0 || Buehrle (10–10) || Hochevar (6–11) || || 2:17 || 37,838 || 67–53 || box
|- align="center" bgcolor="bbffbb"
| 121 || August 14 || Royals || 9–2 || Broadway (1–0) || Davies (5–4) || || 3:00 || 32,788 || 68–53 || box
|- align="center" bgcolor="ffbbbb"
| 122 || August 15 || @ Athletics || 4–6 || Street (3–5) || H. Ramírez (1–2) || || 2:44 || 19,405 || 68–54 || box
|- align="center" bgcolor="bbffbb"
| 123 || August 16 || @ Athletics || 2–1 || Danks (10–5) || Smith (5–12) || Jenks (25) || 3:01 || 22,206 || 69–54 || box
|- align="center" bgcolor="bbffbb"
| 124 || August 17 || @ Athletics || 13–1 || Vázquez (10–10) || Gonzalez (1–2) || || 2:19 || 28,843 || 70–54 || box
|- align="center" bgcolor="bbffbb"
| 125 || August 18 || Mariners || 13–5 || Buehrle (11–10) || Washburn (5–13) || || 2:43 || 39,002 || 71–54 || box
|- align="center" bgcolor="bbffbb"
| 126 || August 19 || Mariners || 5–0 || Richard (1–2) || Hernández (7–8) || || 2:36 || 26,414 || 72–54 || box
|- align="center" bgcolor="bbffbb"
| 127 || August 20 || Mariners || 15–3 || Floyd (13–6) || Dickey (3–8) || || 2:30 || 27,000 || 73–54 || box
|- align="center" bgcolor="ffbbbb"
| 128 || August 22 || Rays || 4–9 || Jackson (10–8) || Danks (10–6) || || 3:20 || 38,747 || 73–55 || box
|- align="center" bgcolor="ffbbbb"
| 129 || August 23 || Rays || 3–5 || Balfour (4–2) || Vázquez (10–11) || Wheeler (8) || 3:04 || 36,482 || 73–56 || box
|- align="center" bgcolor="bbffbb"
| 130 || August 24 || Rays || 6 – 5 (10) || Jenks (3–0) || Hammel (4–4) || || 3:11 || 38,562 || 74–56 || box
|- align="center" bgcolor="bbffbb"
| 131 || August 25 || @ Orioles || 4–3 || Richard (2–2) || Waters (2–1) || Jenks (26) || 2:33 || 20,707 || 75–56 || box
|- align="center" bgcolor="bbffbb"
| 132 || August 26 || @ Orioles || 8–3 || Floyd (14–6) || Burres (7–8) || || 2:44 || 15,398 || 76–56 || box 
|- align="center" bgcolor="ffbbbb"
| 133 || August 27 || @ Orioles || 3–11 || Liz (5–3) || Danks (10–7) || || 2:49 || 15,736 || 76–57 || box
|- align="center" bgcolor="ffbbbb"
| 134 || August 29 || @ Red Sox || 0–8 || Matsuzaka (16–2) || Vázquez (10–12) || || 2:48 || 37,755 || 76–58 || box
|- align="center" bgcolor="ffbbbb"
| 135 || August 30 || @ Red Sox || 2–8 || Bowden (1–0) || Buehrle (11–11) || || 2:40 || 37,751 || 76–59 || box
|- align="center" bgcolor="bbffbb"
| 136 || August 31 || @ Red Sox || 4–2 || Floyd (15–6) || Wakefield (8–9) || Jenks (27) || 2:47 || 37,391 || 77–59 || box
|-

|- align="center" bgcolor="ffbbbb"
| 137 || September 1 || @ Indians || 0–5 || Lee (20–2) || Richard (2–3) || || 2:26 || 23,317 || 77–60 || box
|- align="center" bgcolor="ffbbbb"
| 138 || September 2 || @ Indians || 3–9 || Carmona (8–5) || Danks (10–8) || || 3:12 || 20,980 || 77–61 || box
|- align="center" bgcolor="bbffbb"
| 139 || September 3 || @ Indians || 4–2 || Vázquez (11–12) || Sowers (2–8) || Jenks (28) || 3:12 || 20,328 || 78–61 || box
|- align="center" bgcolor="bbffbb"
| 140 || September 5 || Angels || 10–2 || Buehrle (12–11) || Moseley (1–4) || || 2:48 || 32,502 || 79–61 || box 
|- align="center" bgcolor="bbffbb"
| 141 || September 6 || Angels || 7 – 6 (15) || Wassermann (1–1) || Speier (1–8) || || 3:54 || 31,046 || 80–61 || box
|- align="center" bgcolor="ffbbbb"
| 142 || September 7 || Angels || 2–3 || Saunders (15–7) || H. Ramírez (1–4) || Rodríguez (55) || 2:44 || 26,029 || 80–62 || box
|- align="center" bgcolor="bbbbbb"
| – || September 8 || Blue Jays ||colspan=8| Postponed (rain), rescheduled for September 9
|- align="center" bgcolor="ffbbbb"
| 143 || September 9 || Blue Jays || 1–3 || Burnett (17–10) || Vázquez (11–13) || Ryan (28) || 3:08 || 24,621 || 80–63 || box
|- align="center" bgcolor="ffbbbb"
| 144 || September 9 || Blue Jays || 2–8 || Litsch (11–8) || Richard (2–4) || || 2:37 || 28,505 || 80–64 || box 
|- align="center" bgcolor="bbffbb"
| 145 || September 10 || Blue Jays || 6–5 || Buehrle (13–11) || Halladay (18–10) || || 2:39 || 26,198 || 81–64 || box
|- align="center" bgcolor="ffbbbb"
| 146 || September 11 || Blue Jays || 4–6 || Marcum (9–6) || Floyd (15–7) || Ryan (29) || 2:57 || 27,170 || 81–65 || box
|- align="center" bgcolor="bbbbbb"
| – || September 12 || Tigers || colspan=8 | Postponed (rain) Rescheduled for September 13
|- align="center" bgcolor="bbbbbb"
| – || September 13 || Tigers ||colspan=8| Postponed (rain), rescheduled for September 14
|- align="center" bgcolor="bbbbbb"
| – || September 13 || Tigers ||colspan=8| Postponed (rain), rescheduled for September 29
|- align="center" bgcolor="bbffbb"
| 147 || September 14 || Tigers || 4–2 || Vázquez (12–13) || Verlander (10–16) || || 2:17 || N/A || 82–65 || box
|- align="center" bgcolor="bbffbb"
| 148 || September 14 || Tigers || 11–7 || Thornton (5–3) || Seay (1–2) || || 3:16 || 28,238 || 83–65 || box
|- align="center" bgcolor="ffbbbb"
| 149 || September 15 || @ Yankees || 2–4 || Coke (1–0) || Wassermann (1–2) || Rivera (36) || 2:39 || 53,236 || 83–66 || box
|- align="center" bgcolor="bbffbb"
| 150 || September 16 || @ Yankees || 6–2 || Floyd (16–7) || Pettitte (13–14) || || 3:02 || 52,558 || 84–66 || box
|- align="center" bgcolor="ffbbbb"
| 151 || September 17 || @ Yankees || 1–5 || Bruney (3–0) || Richard (2–5) || || 2:40 || 52,671 || 84–67 || box
|- align="center" bgcolor="ffbbbb"
| 152 || September 18 || @ Yankees || 2–9 || Mussina (18–9) || Vázquez (12–14) || || 3:08 || 53,152 || 84–68 || box
|- align="center" bgcolor="bbffbb"
| 153 || September 19 || @ Royals || 9–4 || Buehrle (14–11) || Bannister (8–16) || || 2:40 || 26,049 || 85–68 || box
|- align="center" bgcolor="ffbbbb"
| 154 || September 20 || @ Royals || 2–5 || Davies (8–7) || Floyd (16–8) || Soria (41) || 2:32 || 23,754 || 85–69 || box
|- align="center" bgcolor="bbffbb"
| 155 || September 21 || @ Royals || 3–0 || Danks (11–8) || Duckworth (3–2) || Jenks (29) || 2:28 || 16,920 || 86–69 || box
|- align="center" bgcolor="ffbbbb"
| 156 || September 23 || @ Twins || 3–9 || Baker (10–4) || Vázquez (12–15) || || 2:43 || 35,225 || 86–70 || box
|- align="center" bgcolor="ffbbbb"
| 157 || September 24 || @ Twins || 2–3 || Blackburn (11–10) || Buehrle (14–12) || Nathan (39) || 2:42 || 42,126 || 86–71 || box
|- align="center" bgcolor="ffbbbb"
| 158 || September 25 || @ Twins || 6 – 7 (10) || Nathan (1–2) || Jenks (3–1) || || 3:27 || 43,601 || 86–72 || box
|- align="center" bgcolor="ffbbbb"
| 159 || September 26 || Indians || 8–11 || S. Lewis (4–0) || Danks (11–9) || J. Lewis (13) || 3:36 || 36,494 || 86–73 || box
|- align="center" bgcolor="ffbbbb"
| 160 || September 27 || Indians || 6–12 || Jackson (2–3) || Vázquez (12–16) || || 3:05 || 36,031 || 86–74 || box
|- align="center" bgcolor="bbffbb"
| 161 || September 28 || Indians || 5–1 || Buehrle (15–12) || Bullington (0–2) || || 2:29 || 33,396 || 87–74 || box
|- align="center" bgcolor="bbffbb"
| 162 || September 29 || Tigers || 8–2 || Floyd (17–8) || Galarraga (13–7) || || 3:14 || 35,923 || 88–74 || box
|- align="center" bgcolor="bbffbb"
| 163* || September 30 || Twins || 1–0 || Danks (12–9) || Blackburn (11–11) || Jenks (30) || 2:20 || 40,354 || 89–74 || box
|-

| *AL Central tiebreaker

|- align="center" bgcolor="ffbbbb"
| 1 || October 2 || @ Rays || 4–6 || Shields (1–0) || Vázquez (0–1) || Wheeler (1) || 3:10 || 35,041 || 0–1 || box
|- align="center" bgcolor="ffbbbb"
| 2 || October 3 || @ Rays || 2–6 || Kazmir (1–0) || Buehrle (0–1) || || 3:10 || 35,257 || 0–2 || box
|- align="center" bgcolor="bbffbb"
| 3 || October 5 || Rays || 5–3 || Danks (1–0) || Garza (0–1) || Jenks (1) || 3:07 || 40,142 || 1–2 || box
|- align="center" bgcolor="ffbbbb"
| 4 || October 6 || Rays || 2–6 || Sonnanstine (1–0) || Floyd (0–1) || || 3:13 || 40,454 || 1–3 || box
|-

Roster

Player stats

Batting 
Note: G = Games played; AB = At bats; R = Runs scored; H = Hits; 2B = Doubles; 3B = Triples; HR = Home runs; RBI = Runs batted in; AVG = Batting average; SB = Stolen bases

Pitching 
Note: W = Wins; L = Losses; ERA = Earned run average; G = Games pitched; GS = Games started; SV = Saves; IP = Innings pitched; R = Runs allowed; ER = Earned runs allowed; BB = Walks allowed; K = Strikeouts

Farm system 

LEAGUE CHAMPIONS: Great Falls

Trivia 
 The 2008 White Sox became the first team to ever win its last three regular season games against three different opponents.

References 

 Game logs:
1st half: Chicago White Sox game log on ESPN.com
2nd half: Chicago White Sox game log on ESPN.com
 Batting statistics: Chicago White Sox batting stats on ESPN.com
 Pitching statistics: Chicago White Sox pitching stats on ESPN.com

External links 

 2008 Chicago White Sox season at Baseball Reference

Chicago White Sox seasons
Chicago White Sox season
American League Central champion seasons
Chicago White Sox